Brice Gertoux (born May 13, 1744, in Ancizan (Hautes-Pyrénées) and died on January 25, 1812) was a French politician in Campan (Hautes-Pyrénées).

Biography 

Lawyer in Tarbes, he was deputy of the Hautes-Pyrénées from 1791 to 1798. He voted for the imprisonment of Louis XVI and was elected to the Council of Five Hundred on 22 Vendémiaire year IV. He left this assembly in the  year VII.

Sources 

1744 births
1812 deaths
Members of the Legislative Assembly (France)
Deputies to the French National Convention
Members of the Council of Five Hundred